Buen Retiro Ballivian Airport  is an airstrip  northeast of Santa Rosa de Yacuma in the lightly populated pampa of the Beni Department in Bolivia.

See also

Transport in Bolivia
List of airports in Bolivia

References

External links 
OpenStreetMap - Buen Retiro
OurAirports - Buen Retiro
Fallingrain - Buen Retiro Ballivian Airport
HERE/Nokia Maps - Buen Retiro Ballivian

Airports in Beni Department